Stéphanie Pernod-Beaudon (born 13 October 1978) is a French politician who was the member of the 14th legislature of the French Fifth Republic for Ain's 3rd constituency.

Career 
She contested Ain's 3rd constituency at the 2017 French legislative election.

References 

1978 births
Living people
Deputies of the 14th National Assembly of the French Fifth Republic
Politicians from Bourg-en-Bresse
Regional councillors of Auvergne-Rhône-Alpes
The Republicans (France) politicians
Women members of the National Assembly (France)
21st-century French women